The Calhoun Street Historic District is a U.S. historic district (designated as such on October 24, 1979) located in Tallahassee, Florida. The district is on Calhoun Street between US 90 and SR 61. It contains 16 historic buildings.

References

External links

 Leon County listings at National Register of Historic Places

Geography of Tallahassee, Florida
National Register of Historic Places in Tallahassee, Florida
Historic districts on the National Register of Historic Places in Florida